Bodkin is a surname. Notable people with the surname include:

 Amby Bodkin, Irish lawyer and duelist
 Archibald Bodkin (1862–1957), English lawyer and Director of Public Prosecutions
 Christopher Bodkin (died 1572), Irish prelate, Archbishop of Tuam and Bishop of Kilmacduagh
 Dominick Dáll Bodkin (died 1740), Irish mass murderer
 Edward Bodkin, American underground surgeon arrested in 1998
 J. Alexander Bodkin psychiatrist 
 John Bodkin (disambiguation)
 Joseph Bodkin (1902–1950), Australian politician
 Matt Bodkin (born 1968), English footballer
 Matthias McDonnell Bodkin (1850–1933), Irish MP, author, journalist, newspaper editor, barrister and judge
 Matthias Bodkin (1896–1973), Irish Jesuit priest and author, son of the above
 Maud Bodkin (1875–1967), British classical scholar
 Odds Bodkin (born 1953), pseudonym of an American storyteller, musician, and author
 Peter Bodkin (1924–1994), English cricketer
 Richard Bodkin, mayor of Galway (1610–1611)
 Shane Bodkin, mayor of Carlingford (1830–1844)
 Teresina Bodkin, Montserrat teacher and civil servant, first woman Speaker (2010–2014) of Montserrat's Legislative Council
 Thomas Bodkin (1887–1961), Irish lawyer, art historian, art collector and curator
 Thomas Bodkin (mayor), mayor of Galway (1506–1507)
 Tom Bodkin, American newspaper designer
 William Bodkin (judge) (1791–1874), British barrister and politician
 William Bodkin (New Zealand politician) (1885–1964)

Fictional characters include:
 Monty Bodkin, a recurring character in P. G. Wodehouse novels

See also
 Botkin, a surname